Archelis (アルケリス arukerisu, from arukeru isu 歩ける椅子, "walkable chair" in Japanese) is a wearable chair designed and manufactured by Yokohama-based mold factory, Nitto in association with Japan Polymer Technology, Chiba University's Center for Frontier Medical Engineering and Hiroaki Nishimura Design. The purpose of the chair is to aid industry workers and medical surgeons who had to work for long hours standing. As of February 2016, it is specially designed for medical surgeons, allowing them to sit during physically demanding surgical operations which reduces fatigue in surgeons.

History 
Patents for similar wearable devices dates back to more than four decades which has since been expired. The original patent for the invention was first made by Darcy Robert Bonner in 1977 which was later granted as D249,987 in October 1978. In 2015, Swiss engineers came up with a similar product called Noonee which is a hydraulic-powered exoskeleton made of a titanium frame. Noonee was tested on workers of German car manufacturing company, Audi.

Function 
The device while worn, makes the angle of ankle and knee stable to enable a standing orientation such that the knees moderately bent but without applying any effort on the legs and without exerting pressure on the joints. The body coercion gets shared out to the shin and thigh, minimizing the muscle fatigue.

The device can be locked into unassociated positions for each limb to permit the user to stand in a comfortable way. The designers believe that the device is perfect for medical surgeons who need to stand for long hours during operations.

Structure 
The system involves no cell or power, made of carbon segments and materialized with hook and loop closures. It was noted by the company that the device is comfortable to use for long hours as the carbon parts are flexible.

Public 
The wearable chair is under active development as of February 2016 and is currently not available for the public to purchase.

In seasons 5 and 6 of Silicon Valley, recurring character Gabe is always showing wearing an Archelis.

References 

Chairs
Individual models of furniture